Rannikko (literally "coast, coastline") is a Finnish family name. Notable people with the surname include:
  (1933–2010), Finnish lieutenant general
 Juho Rannikko (1873–1933), Finnish farmer and politician
 Teemu Rannikko (born 1980), Finnish basketball player
  (born 1947), Finnish author

Finnish-language surnames
Toponymic surnames